The 2012 Tennessee Volunteers football team represented the University of Tennessee in the 2012 NCAA Division I FBS football season. The Volunteers played their home games at Neyland Stadium in Knoxville, Tennessee and competed in the Eastern Division of the Southeastern Conference (SEC). The team was coached by Derek Dooley, who was in his third season with Tennessee. On November 18, 2012 Dooley was fired after 11 games following a 41–18 loss to in-state rival Vanderbilt.  Dooley ended his three-year tenure at Tennessee with losing records of 15–21 overall and 4-19 in the SEC.  Offensive coordinator Jim Chaney was named interim head coach for the final game of the season against Kentucky. The season was Tennessee's third consecutive losing season, a streak the program had not matched since 1909-1911.

Schedule

Schedule Source:

Rankings

Coaching staff

Game summaries

NC State

The Tennessee Volunteers opened the season in the Georgia Dome against NC State in the annual Chick-fil-A Kickoff Game. Junior college transfer WR Cordarrelle Patterson put a show early on in his debut as a Volunteer, catching a 41-yard touchdown as well as rushing for a 67-yard touchdown on a reverse, both during the first quarter. Tyler Bray threw for 333 passing yards with two touchdowns, including a 72-yard bomb to Zach Rogers, who beat NC State star cornerback David Amerson down the field. The defense not only recorded a safety but also forced 4 interceptions by NC State quarterback Mike Glennon. Despite Bray losing a fumble at the end of the first half, Tennessee would continue to dominate the rest of the game. On the opening possession of the 2nd half, Rajion Neal rushed for an 8-yard touchdown, which would be followed by a 20-yard field goal by Michael Palardy to extend the Vol's lead to 32-14. NC State responded in the 4th when Glennon threw a touchdown to Bryan Underwood to whittle Tennessee's lead down to 32-21. Too bad for Glennon he would also throw 2 of his 4 interceptions during the 4th quarter, and after one more Palardy field goal, Tennessee would go on to win 35-21.

Team players drafted into the NFL

Reference:

References

Tennessee
Tennessee Volunteers football seasons
Tennessee Volunteers football